Three Men in a Boat is a 1920 British silent comedy film directed by Challis Sanderson and starring Lionelle Howard, Manning Haynes and Johnny Butt. It is an adaptation of the 1889 novel Three Men in a Boat by Jerome K. Jerome. The screenplay concerns three friends who go on a boating holiday.

Premise
Three friends enjoy a series of comic adventures when they go for a boating holiday on the River Thames.

Cast
 Lionelle Howard as J. 
 Manning Haynes as Harris 
 Johnny Butt as George 
 Eva Westlake   
 Edward C. Bright  
 Florence Turner

References

External links

1920 films
1920s musical comedy films
British musical comedy films
Films directed by Challis Sanderson
Films set in England
British films based on plays
British silent feature films
Films based on works by Jerome K. Jerome
British black-and-white films
1920 comedy films
1920s English-language films
1920s British films
Silent comedy films